Ferrigno is an Italian surname which is most prevalent in the regions of Campania and Sicily and is also to be found among the American, French and Argentinian Italian diaspora. Notable people with the surname include:
 Antonio Ferrigno (1863–1940), Italian painter
 Dan Ferrigno (born 1953), American football coach and former player
 Lou Ferrigno (born 1951), American actor
 Lou Ferrigno Jr. (born 1984), American actor
 Robert Ferrigno (born 1947), American author
 Steve Ferrigno (1900–1930), New York City mobster of Sicilian origin

References

Italian-language surnames